Falcons of Narabedla is a science fiction novel by American writer Marion Zimmer Bradley set in the universe of her Darkover series. It was first published in book form in English by Ace Books in 1964, as an Ace Double with Bradley's collection The Dark Intruder and Other Stories on the other side. The story first appeared in the May 1957 issue of the magazine Other Worlds.

The name "Narabedla" is the name of the star "Aldebaran" spelled backwards.

Plot introduction
The novel concerns a person who is transported into the future and an alien world where Terrans and Darkovans have meshed and become decadent.

Sources

External links
 
 

Darkover books
1964 American novels
Fiction set around Aldebaran
American fantasy novels
Novels by Marion Zimmer Bradley
Works originally published in Other Worlds (magazine)
1966 fantasy novels
1966 science fiction novels
Ace Books books